Hostages is an Indian Hindi-language crime thriller web series for Hotstar Specials, which is an official remake of an Israeli series of the same name. Written by Nisarg Mehta, Shiva Bajpai and Mayukh Ghosh, the series is directed by Sudhir Mishra. Starring Tisca Chopra, Ronit Roy, Parvin Dabas, Aashim Gulati, Mohan Kapoor, Dalip Tahil, with Malhaar Rathod, Sharad Joshi, Aashim Gulati, Surya Sharma and Anangsha Biswas in supporting roles. The series is about a renowned surgeon who is scheduled for a routine operation on the chief minister was ordered to assassinate him in the process, in order to save family being captivated.

Sameer Nair of Applause Entertainment brought the rights for the adaptation in April 2018, followed by the principal shooting which started in May 2018 and completed in March 2019. Marked as Sudhir Mishra's digital debut, the series was eventually premiered on Disney+ Hotstar on 31 May 2019. The series received mixed response, and although the writing was criticised, critics praised the performances of Ronit Roy and Tisca Chopra. The actors eventually won two awards at the Gold Awards (an award ceremony for television-based content) for their performances. The series was also broadcast on Star Plus in April 2020.

A second season was officially announced on 16 October 2019. The narrative of the second season eventually follows a week after the events of the first season, with the retired cop, kidnaps the chief minister for a bone marrow transplant to save his wife's life. Production of the second season began in October 2019 and ended in July 2020, despite production delays due to COVID-19 pandemic. The new season is directed by Sachin Krishn, replacing its predecessor Sudhir Krishna, who also worked on the second series. It was premiered through Disney+ Hotstar on 9 September 2020.

Premise

Season 1 
Surgeon Dr. Mira Anand (Tisca Chopra) is scheduled to perform a routine operation on the chief minister, but the night before the procedure, her family is taken hostage and she is ordered to assassinate her unwitting patient in order to save her family, forcing her to make a decision.

Season 2 
The story starts a week after season 1. Handa is still under captivity and the whole crew is about to move to Nepal to perform the bonemarrow operation. When Handa tries to escape, an unexpected change of plan leads the team to take refuge in a dilapidated old mansion where shooting results in a hostage situation. When new players and motives behind the original plan is revealed more complex situation rises which Prithvi now has to overcome including saving his daughter's life.

Cast

Main 
 Ronit Roy as Superintendent of Police Prithvi Singh
 Tisca Chopra as Dr. Mira Anand (Season 1)
 Parvin Dabas as Sanjay Anand (Season 1)
 Aashim Gulati as Aman
 Mohan Kapur as Subramanian
 Dalip Tahil as CM Khushwant Lal Handa
 Anangsha Biswas as Hyma
 Shri Swara Dubey as Saba Singh, Prithvi's wife
 Meenal Kapoor as Sneha (Head Nurse)
 Amit Sial as Peter George (Morgue Incharge)
 Faezeh Jalali as Sarah George
 Sharad Joshi as Shovan Anand (Season 1)
 Malhaar Rathod as Shaina Anand (Season 1)

 Anuranjan Awasthi as Aditya Sinha (Season 1)
Md Azimul Islam Sheblu as Rony hossain  (season 1)
 Surya Sharma as Prince
 Kanwaljit Singh as Karnail Singh, head of ATS (Season 2)
 Divya Dutta as Ayesha Khan (Season 2)
 Sachin Khurana as DSP Ashwini Dutt
 Dino Morea as Ranbir (Season 2)
 Shibani Dandekar as Isha Andrews (Season 2)
 Asif Basra as Asghar Nabi (Season 2)
 Shweta Basu Prasad as Shikha Pandey (Season 2)
 Rahul Bagga as Navin
 Danish Sood as Rohan, Shikha's friend and colleague (Season 2)
 Shilpa Shukla as Shanaya Sahni (Season 2)
 Danish Husain as Arjun Bhasin / Owais (Season 2)
 Himanshi Choudhry as Kanika Arora, Journalist (season 2)

Recurring 
 Manish Uppal as Naveen Khatana
 Parag Gupta as Bunty
 Megha Bestie as Girl Hostage
 Danish Kalra as Dr. Shastri
 Harish Khatri as Dr. Hingoorani
 Dalip Gulati as Doctor 1
 Shahnawaz Pradhan as Shukla
 Yusuf Hussain as Dr. Ali
 Pratik Parihar as Sniper Commando
 Richa Goswami as Avantika (CM’S Secretary)
 Saajan Malhotra as Rakesh (CM Security Guard 1)
 Dayaram Yadav as CM Security Guard 2
 Sumit Yadav as Arms Dealer
 Bhavesh Babani as Sameer Kapoor
 Palak Sindhwani as Min (Shovan’S Crush)
 Ritu as Mishra Lata (Maid)
 Manu Malik as Mahesh (Neighbour)
 Akanksha Khatri

Episodes

Season 1

Season 2

Production

Development 
In April 2018, Sameer Nair, CEO of Aditya Birla Group's content studio Applause Entertainment, announced their collaboration with Armoza Formats, in order to adapt the Israeli series Hostages, La Famiglia and Honey Badgers. Sameer Nair initially slated that he has been a fan of Israeli content, due to a close cultural affinity and stated that the series have incredibly universal appeal. The team planned of filming of the series after the completion of the writing and casting process. In May 2018, the production house officially announced the details of the cast and crew members, with Sudhir Mishra being assigned to direct the series, and Ronit Roy, Tisca Chopra and Parvin Dabas were roped in for the principal cast.

For the second season, Sudhir Mishra eventually roped in Sachin Krishn, the cinematographer of the first season as well as Sudhir's previous films. In October 2020, Sachin announced that there will be a third season.

Casting 
Ronit Roy who plays the role of Prithvi Singh, a retired cop, initially accepted the script stating that the original series being hugely appreciated all over the globe. In an interview with Indo-Asian News Service, he stated "My character in the series is very intriguing. I constantly strive to keep my audiences engaged and entertained with each of my performances." Tisca Chopra who plays the role of a renowned surgeon, Dr. Mira Anand, eventually said that her character "is very demanding and it will be challenging to live up to the high hopes set by the original show." The supproting characters include Malhaar Rathod, Sharad Joshi, Aashim Gulati, Surya Sharma and Anangsha Biswas.

With Ronit being retained for the second season, Dino Morea, Shibani Dandekar, Divya Dutta and Shweta Basu Prasad, were the new addition for the cast. Some of the old members like Dalip Tahil, Surya Sharma, Aashim Gulati, Anangsha Biswas and Mohan Kapur are still a part of the series.

Filming

Season 1 
Principal shoot of the first season took place in Delhi in May 2018. The team had shot major sequences at Delhi, bracing extreme climatic conditions, as the temperature is high as 48-49 degrees. While filming the climax sequence at a National Zoological Park in New Delhi, Ronit Roy, suffered major injuries, and undergone 17 stitches in order to continue shooting. Speaking about this experience, Ronit Roy said, "It was the most difficult chase sequence towards the end of our shoot, while we shot for the climax in the national park in Delhi. It was not just me, but the entire unit was running through that forest." Shooting was wrapped up in March 2019.

Season 2 
On 16 October 2019, the series was officially renewed for a second season. Within announcement, the makers kickstarted the shooting of the series, with principal shoot being held across Delhi, Mumbai and a few scenes were shot in Nepal. However, shooting was delayed due to the COVID-19 pandemic in India, with post-production works being affected. The makers resumed the shoot in July 2020, following the necessary safety guidelines imposed by the government, to avoid the pandemic spread, and was eventually wrapped by the end of the month.

Release 
The series' digital distribution rights were brought by Hotstar. On 15 January 2019, the streaming platform announced that the series will be released under the label Hotstar Specials, with the production house Applause Entertainment collaborated with Hotstar to release it through first set of their original contents in March 2019. A poster which released on 13 May 2019, features Ronit Roy, taking Tisca Chopra as a hostage. But, however Rohit claimed that it was a suspense. On 15 May 2019, a 30-second trailer was unveiled through social media platforms, receiving positive response. The first season of the series was released on Hotstar on 31 May 2019, in Hindi, Tamil, Telugu, Malayalam, Kannada, Bengali and Marathi languages.

In April 2020, Star Plus announced for a premiere of the web series, as the shooting of television shows were affected due to the COVID-19 pandemic lockdown in India, eventually halting the premiere of new episodes in television. The series consisting of 10-episodes was premiered at the channel in the 10:30 p.m. IST slot, which eventually belonged to the paranormal thriller Nazar 2, for the same channel. With this, Hostages became the first Hotstar Specials series to be premiered directly on television. Commenting on this Ronit Roy stated, "The good part is that people get it to watch it for free. If they enjoy it, they might subscribe to Hotstar. The section of people, who only watch traditional TV, who do not have access to OTT platforms, will get to watch the show. If they like it, some of them might go to OTT to watch the second season. Its a win-win situation in both ways."

The second season of the series was eventually scheduled to be released in May 2020, but delayed as the work in post-production got interrupted due to the COVID-19 pandemic in India. On 31 August 2020, the official trailer of the second season was released through social media platforms, receiving positive response from fans. The series premiered through Disney+ Hotstar on 9 September 2020.

Reception

Critical response

Season 1 
The first season of the series eventually received mixed response from critics. Archika Khurana, writing for The Times of India, gave three out of five stars and stated "The series tries too hard to be an edge-of-the-seat thriller by relying solely on performances, instead, the makers should have worked on coming up with a tighter script." Bloomberg Quint's Karishma Upadhyay, rated the same and wrote "A riveting home-invasion drama at its core, Hostages keeps you rooted to your seat with its twists and turns, but also leaves you a little baffled with the unreal lives of its characters." Shweta Kesari of India Today, commented "Ronit Roy, Tisca Chopra starrer is intriguing in parts but fails to hold the interest of its viewers."

Sonali Kokra of Firstpost gave two out of five and summarised "Hostages is honest to a fault about sticking to its mandate of being the official Hindi adaptation of a hit Israeli show by the same name. Like the original, the first season of the Hindi iteration is exactly 10 episodes long, each one recreated almost scene for scene, with scarcely any alterations in the dialogue or the screenplay. But while the original was saved from drowning in the absurdities of its script by stellar acting and a determined cast, the Hindi version offers no such respite." Sowmya Srivatsava of Hindustan Times rated the series, one-and-a-half out of fiive and summarised "Hostages is a generic thriller that offers nothing new in terms of the story it tells, the characters it introduces, the way it is shot or even the themes it plays with."

Season 2 
The second season received mixed response. Archika Khuaran of The Times of India, gave three out of five stars and stated "The series has no dull moments owing to the ample twists-and-turns that keep the momentum going. The show is engaging and keeps its audience hooked while the battle between the both sides are on." Pradeep Menon of Firstpost gave three out of five and stated "Hostages is the sort of show that takes generous liberties with logic and possibilities, but that hardly comes in the way of you moving to the next episode." Udita Jhunjhunwala, writing for Scroll.in commented "A bunch of guest appearances, some unexpected returning characters and a lot of going round in circles later, the season ends with a dramatic climax, which should satisfy fans of Hostages." Gaurang Chauhan of Zoom TV, gave three-and-a-half out of five stars and commented "Hostages season 2 is a worthy sequel to the thrilling season 1."

In contrast, Ektaa Malik of The Indian Express gave one-and-a-half out of five and summarised "Hostages Season 2 is a wasted effort. There are plenty of twists of turns, and if done well, the show could have been a binge-worthy, edge-of-the-seat thriller." Saraswati Datar of The News Minute commented "Hostages Season 2 has too many distractions and plot entanglements to keep us invested in the ‘hostages’ and their safety for 12 long episodes." Gauthaman Bhaskaran of News18 gave two out of five and stated "Hostages 2 seems stretched, with the rest of the story in not only as predictable, but has incidents that are uncomfortably distracting." Namrata Thakkar of Rediff gave two-and-a-half out of five and commented "Hostages 2 is not as crisp and engaging as season one. But the show is still worth watching once because of Ronit Roy and a few other fine performances."

Awards and nominations

See also 
 List of SonyLIV original programming
 Tanaav
 Tandav (web series)

References

External links
 

Hindi-language Disney+ Hotstar original programming
2019 Indian television series debuts
Indian drama television series
Hindi-language television shows
Thriller web series
Crime thriller web series
Indian television series based on non-Indian television series